Estakhruiyeh (also Romanized as Estakhrū’īyeh and Estakhroo’eyeh; also known as Estarkhū’īyeh and Ishtalkhu) is a village in Baghin Rural District, in the Central District of Kerman County, Kerman Province, Iran. At the time of the 2006 census, its population was 354, including 84 families.

References 

Populated places in Kerman County